The Luxembourg men's national under-18 basketball team is a national basketball team of Luxembourg, administered by the Luxembourg Basketball Federation It represents the country in international men's under-18 basketball competitions.

Luxembourg has attained moderate results at the Division B level, although they have achieved success at the Division C level having won three bronze medals in the past.

FIBA U18 European Championship participations

See also
Luxembourg men's national basketball team
Luxembourg men's national under-16 basketball team
Luxembourg women's national under-18 basketball team

References

External links
Official website 
Archived records of Luxembourg team participations

Basketball teams in Luxembourg
Basketball
Men's national under-18 basketball teams